Organic architecture is a philosophy of architecture which promotes harmony between human habitation and the natural world. This is achieved through design approaches that aim to be sympathetic and well-integrated with a site, so buildings, furnishings, and surroundings become part of a unified, interrelated composition.

An organicist is an architect in the organic movement.

History
The term "organic architecture" was coined by Frank Lloyd Wright (1867–1959), though never well-articulated by his cryptic style of writing:

So here I stand before you preaching organic architecture: declaring organic architecture to be the modern ideal and the teaching so much needed if we are to see the whole of life and to now serve the whole of life, holding no traditions essential to the great TRADITION. Nor cherishing any preconceived form fixing upon us either past, present, or future, but instead exalting the simple laws of common sense or of super-sense if you prefer determining form by way of the nature of materials...

Organic architecture is also translated into the all-inclusive nature of Wright's design process. Materials, motifs, and basic ordering principles continue to repeat themselves throughout the building as a whole. The idea of organic architecture refers not only to the buildings' literal relationship to the natural surroundings, but how the buildings' design is carefully thought about as if it were a unified organism. Geometries throughout Wright's buildings build a central mood and theme.

Essentially organic architecture is also the literal design of every element of a building: From the windows to the floors, to the individual chairs intended to fill the space. Everything relates to one another, reflecting the symbiotic ordering systems of nature.

Other modernist architects in the U.S., Europe, and elsewhere held complementarily and often competing views of how architecture could best emulate nature. Key figures in the U.S. included Louis Sullivan, Claude Bragdon, Eugene Tsui and Paul Laffoley while among European modernists Hugo Häring, Hans Scharoun, and Rudolf Steiner stand out. Following World War II, organic architecture often reflected cybernetic and informatic models of life, as is reflected in the later work of futurist architect Buckminster Fuller.

Architect and planner David Pearson proposed a list of rules towards the design of organic architecture. These rules are known as the Gaia Charter for organic architecture and design. It reads:

"Let the design:
 be inspired by nature and be sustainable, healthy, conserving, and diverse.
 unfold, like an organism, from the seed within.
 exist in the "continuous present" and "begin again and again".
 follow the flows and be flexible and adaptable.
 satisfy social, physical, and spiritual needs.
 "grow out of the site" and be unique.
 celebrate the spirit of youth, play, and surprise.
 express the rhythm of music and the power of dance."

A well-known example of organic architecture is Fallingwater, the residence Wright designed for the Kaufmann family in rural Pennsylvania. Wright had many choices to locate a home on this large site but chose to place the home directly over the waterfall and creek creating a close, yet noisy dialog with the rushing water and the steep site. The horizontal striations of stone masonry with daring cantilevers of colored beige concrete blend with native rock outcroppings and the wooded environment. In postwar Europe, the Hungarian Imre Makovecz was one of the most prominent proponents of organic architecture.

There are contemporary creations of organic architecture. The definition of 'organic' has dramatically changed during recent times. Avoiding materials of construction that require more embodied energy to build and sustain it, when the building blends naturally and sits seamlessly to its surroundings, reflecting cultural continuity, it is 'organic' and is idealistic. Examples include leaving natural material, such as bedrock, exposed and unsculptured, such as the underground Rådhuset metro station in Stockholm, which appears to occupy a natural cave system.

See also

Complementary architecture
Biomorphism
Metaphoric architecture
Zoomorphic architecture

References

External links

 
 Bureau for organic architecture - Udo Heimermann

 
Architectural styles
20th-century architectural styles